is a Japanese professional football club based in Inagi, Tokyo. The club currently play in the J2 League, the Japanese second tier of professional football in the country.

History 

Founded as Yomiuri F.C. in 1969, Tokyo Verdy is one of the most decorated clubs in the J.League, with honours including 2 league titles, 5 Emperor's Cups, 6 JSL Cup/J.League Cups and an Asian Club Championship title, and the most successful team in Japanese football history with 25 titles. The club was an original member of the J.League in 1993.

Early years and rise to the top (1969–1983)

In October 1968, following Japan's bronze medal triumph at the 1968 Summer Olympics in Mexico City and the interest in football that ensued, Japan Football Association president Yuzuru Nozu visited Yomiuri Giants chairman Matsutaro Shoriki to ask him if Yomiuri was willing to ride on the wave of the game by establishing their own football club. Shoriki died a year later, in 1969, but not before signing his name to the plans to establish Yomiuri Football Club. Backed by the Yomiuri Group and NTV, Yomiuri Football Club firstly launched at Tokyo Local League B (5th tier) in 1969. They began gaining promotions from the Tokyo Local League to the Kanto Football League (3rd tier) in 1971. In 1971, Yomiuri marked 3rd place and promoted Japan Soccer League Second Division.

They were promoted to First Division in 1978, starting a long career of success in the top flight. Their first major title was the Japan Soccer League Cup in 1979.

Golden Era (1983–1994) 

From its days as Yomiuri FC, the ownership had visions of a football equivalent of the baseball Yomiuri Giants – a star-studded powerhouse with fans across Japan. As Japanese football began its transition from the JSL to the J.League in the early 1990s, it invested heavily in stars and featured Japan internationals Kazuyoshi Miura, Ruy Ramos and Tsuyoshi Kitazawa.

The last two JSL championships as Yomiuri FC in 1990–91 and 1991–92, and then winning the first two championships as Verdy Kawasaki in 1993 and 1994, effectively winning four straight Japanese league titles making a total of seven overall; the highest in the Japanese system. Verdy also won the 1996 Emperor's Cup and three consecutive J.League Cups from 1992 to 1994.

The JSL disbanded and reformed as the professional J.League in 1993. At this time the team professionalized and renamed itself Verdy Kawasaki, "Coined from the Portuguese "VERDE" meaning "green" probably named after their green jersey colour "Tokyo Greens/Tokyo Verdi", although the color was picked in homage to Brazilian club Palmeiras, a team admired by one of Yomiuri's first idols, São Paulo-born George Yonashiro. Although Yomiuri was dropped from the name as the club spun off from the company, the team remained under Yomiuri's ownership until 1997, when it was acquired by Nippon Television Network, the broadcast arm of the Yomiuri Group.

Lack of success and support (1995–2000)

This early success did not last, however, and as the stars aged, the team's performance suffered. Verdy's 1st-place finish in the 2nd stage of the 1995 season would be its last stage victory and the 1996 Emperor's Cup would be its last major title of the decade. A downturn in the national economy and the cooling of the J.League fad meant all teams had to cut expenses. This meant Verdy could no longer buy expensive replacements for its aging stars.

The 1996 J.League season saw Verdy Kawasaki finish 7th place overall, the lowest standing in the league's existence at that point, and would fall further in the 1997 season, finishing 16th and 12th, in the 1st stage and 2nd stage, respectively, and 15th overall out of 17 teams. Although Verdy looked to return to prominence in 1999, finishing 2nd in the 1st Stage, the resurgence was short-lived as it fell to 10th in the 2nd stage.

Meanwhile, the team's efforts to become "Japan's Team" alienated local fans in Kawasaki. The expensive salaries and struggling attendance caused the club's debts to mount. Struggling to compete with the newly professionalized crosstown rival Kawasaki Frontale and the nearby Yokohama Marinos and Yokohama Flügels, Verdy made the decision to leave Kawasaki.

Return to Tokyo (2001–2005) 

In 2001, the club returned from Kawasaki to Chōfu, Tokyo and was renamed Tokyo Verdy 1969 to reflect the new hometown and the club's origins as Yomiuri. Although Verdy made the move to increase its fan base and distance itself from its rivals, by this time Tokyo was already home to a J1 club in FC Tokyo. Despite a sharp increase in crowd numbers for Verdy, this was still well below those of FC Tokyo. Their new local rivals had been promoted to J1 in 2000 and had already captured a vast number of the supporters Verdy had been hoping to acquire.

In its first year in Tokyo, Tokyo Verdy 1969 found itself trailing FC Tokyo in the standings as well, and finished last in the division at 16th in the first stage of the 2001 season. Only the play of midseason acquisition Edmundo and a win in the final match of the second stage saved the club from relegation to J2. Tokyo Verdy 1969 was back at the bottom of the table in the first stage of the 2002 season, but again finished the season strong, placing 4th in the second stage.

Two mid-table finishes followed in 2003 and 2004, before Tokyo Verdy 1969, under Osvaldo Ardiles, won the Emperor's Cup on 1 January 2005, its first major title in 9 years and the first in Tokyo. Winning the cup earned Verdy a spot in the 2006 AFC Champions League.

However, the 2005 season saw Tokyo Verdy 1969 fall to its worst finish of its history, finishing 17th out of 18. This was the first season after the scrapping of the two-stage season format, and Tokyo Verdy 1969 were relegated to J2, after 28 years of top flight football. The season was marked by three huge losses in July: 1–7 to Gamba Osaka on 2 July, 0–7 to Urawa Red Diamonds on 6 July and a 6–0 loss to Júbilo Iwata on 17 July. Tokyo Verdy then sacked Ardiles two days later. At the time of his sacking, Ardiles' team had conceded 23 goals in their last 5 matches and had a 9 match winless streak. However, the struggling Verdy upset European giant Real Madrid (who were in Asia on a preseason tour), 3–0 on 25 July.

Back in the second tier (2006) 

For the 2006 season, the club appointed former Verdy Kawasaki legend, Ruy Ramos, as manager on 22 December 2005. Tokyo Verdy 1969 found itself in the odd position of competing in the AFC Champions League while playing in the second tier of the national league system. After Tokyo Verdy 1969 was relegated, the club released many of the veteran players, leaving a core of young players, most notably Takayuki Morimoto, who became the youngest player to score in the J.League at age 15 in 2004.

In the 2007 season, Tokyo Verdy 1969 managed to beat Thespa Kusatsu 5–0 on the first day. After a brief scuffle with Consadole Sapporo over the J2 title, Tokyo Verdy 1969 had to settle for runner-up – which was enough to earn promotion back into the top flight for 2008. At this time the club renamed itself for the second time, dropping 1969 from its team name, but the management corporation name remained as Tokyo Verdy 1969.

Verdy would once again be relegated after finishing in 17th place (second to last) in 2008.

On 17 September 2009, NTV announced it would divest itself of shares in the club and transfer it to a new holding company, Tokyo Verdy Holdings, closing 40 years of Yomiuri/NTV direct financial support. The J.League approved the transfer, but made it a condition that Verdy find a new sponsor by 16 November or risk not being able to play J2 football for the 2010 season.

In October 2010, Tokyo Verdy signed a five-year sponsorship deal with sports retail store and apparel company Xebio.
The sponsorship deal saw the Xebio logo placed on Tokyo Verdy's kit and included naming rights for two regular season home games. Xebio also produced the clubs football kit, although under their sports brand "Ennerre". After talks with Xebio, several companies decided to invest in the company and the new Xebio led administration was announced in November.

The club suffered a mere respite from heartbreak during the 2018 season, when they finished 6th, qualifying then for the promotion/relegation playoffs. They beat Omiya Ardija 1–0 in the 1st round, and repeated the script against Yokohama FC in the semi-final. They ended just one game short of a J1 League comeback, having lost in the final by 2–0 against Júbilo Iwata, which saw the promotion hopes fade away for another time. Ever since being relegated to the J2, despite the club's efforts, the club could not return to the J1 and will continue to play at the J2 for the 2023 season.

Other sports 
Verdy is a polideportivo and also fields teams in women's football, volleyball, and triathlon. Tokyo Verdy's women's football team is the 12 time Nadeshiko League champions, 14 time Empress's Cup winners and 1 time AFC Women's Club Championship winners.

Stadium 
Verdy plays its home games at the Ajinomoto Stadium, a stadium with the capacity of 50,000. It is shared with the club's main rivals FC Tokyo, although occasional home matches are played in other stadiums in Tokyo, such as the Ajinomoto Field Nishigaoka.

League and cup record 

Key

Honours 
With seven league titles, five Emperor's Cups and six League Cups, Tokyo Verdy is one of the most decorated football clubs in Japan, although most of its titles came during their stay at Tokyo in the semi-professional era as Yomiuri FC before the inception of the professional J.League.

National

League 
JSL Division 1 (until 1993) and J.League Division 1:
Winners (7): 1983, 1984, 1986–87, 1990–91, 1991–92, 1993, 1994
Runners-up (4): 1979, 1981, 1989–90, 1995
JSL Division 2:
Winners (2): 1974, 1977

Cups 
Emperor's Cup:
Winners (5): 1984, 1986, 1987, 1996, 2004
Runners-up (3): 1981, 1991, 1992
JSL Cup / J.League Cup:
Winners (6): 1979, 1985, 1991, 1992, 1993, 1994
Runners-up (1): 1996
Japanese Super Cup:
Winners (4): 1984, 1994, 1995, 2005
Runners-up (1): 1997
Konica Cup:
Winners (1): 1990

International 
Asian Club Championship:
Winners (1): 1987
Sanwa Bank Cup:
Winners (1): 1994
Runners-up (1): 1995

Players

Current squad
Updated for the last time on 10 February 2023.

Out on loan

Club officials 
As of the 2023 season

Managerial history

Kits and crests 

Tokyo Verdy's main colors are green.

The club's name was coined from the Portuguese, or Spanish, or Italian, or Esperanto "verde" meaning "green", probably named after their green jersey colour, so the meaning is "Tokyo Greens/Tokyo Verdi". In Italian, the form "verdi" indicates the plural form "the greens".

Kit suppliers and shirt sponsors

Kit evolution

See also 
Nippon TV Tokyo Verdy Beleza (Women's club team)
Japan Soccer League (Defunct)
J.League
J1 League
J2 League
J3 League

Notes

References

External links 
 
Tokyo Verdy 1969 – Classic Club Guide at FIFA.com
The club players

 
J.League clubs
CyberAgent
Japan Soccer League clubs
Football clubs in Japan
Association football clubs established in 1969
Football clubs in Tokyo
Emperor's Cup winners
Japanese League Cup winners
1969 establishments in Japan
Nippon TV
AFC Champions League winning clubs